Francisco Jorge Ugarte Hidalgo  (born 21 March 1959), nicknamed "Condorito", is a former Argentine-born Chilean footballer.

Club career
Ugarte began his professional career with Unión La Calera, and spent several seasons playing in Chile before moving to Europe for two seasons with Charleroi in the Belgian League and one season with Giannina in the Greek Super League.

International career
Ugarte made six appearances for the senior Chile national football team, his debut coming in a friendly against Brazil on 9 December 1987.

Coaching career
In recent years, Ugarte moved to Atlanta, Georgia in the United States where he coached for several years and to somewhat success at Atlanta Fire United. Four years ago, Ugarte left AFU to coach at Norcross Soccer Association. In recent years, Ugarte, now known as "Pancho" is the director of coaching at UFA Lawrenceville and has had some success with his under-18 side and his under-15. He is known for passion and his disciplinary actions during his coaching. His teams now compete in the Southern Clubs Champions league.

Personal life
He is the brother-in-law of the Chilean former international footballer Osvaldo Hurtado.

References

External links
 Francisco Ugarte at playmakerstats.com (English version of ceroacero.es)

1959 births
Living people
Sportspeople from Mendoza, Argentina
Argentine sportspeople of Chilean descent
Chilean footballers
Chilean expatriate footballers
Chilean expatriate football managers
Chile international footballers
Unión La Calera footballers
Everton de Viña del Mar footballers
Deportes Ovalle footballers
Trasandino footballers
Cobreloa footballers
Deportes Concepción (Chile) footballers
Unión Española footballers
Deportes La Serena footballers
R. Charleroi S.C. players
PAS Giannina F.C. players
Provincial Osorno footballers
O'Higgins F.C. footballers
C.D. Huachipato footballers
Chilean Primera División players
Belgian Pro League players
Super League Greece players
Primera B de Chile players
Expatriate footballers in Belgium
Chilean expatriate sportspeople in Belgium
Expatriate footballers in Greece
Chilean expatriate sportspeople in Greece
Chilean people of Basque descent
Association football midfielders
Naturalized citizens of Chile
Citizens of Chile through descent
Chilean football managers
Unión Española managers
Chilean Primera División managers
Expatriate soccer managers in the United States
Chilean expatriate sportspeople in the United States